Last Pizza Slice, better known by the acronym LPS, is a Slovenian band. They represented Slovenia in the Eurovision Song Contest 2022 with the song "".

Career 
The band was formed in December 2018 in the music room of the Grammar School Celje-Center.

2022: Eurovision Song Contest 
The Slovenian public broadcaster Radiotelevizija Slovenija (RTVSLO) announced on 26 November 2021 that LPS had been selected as one of 24 entrants to have a chance to represent Slovenia in the Eurovision Song Contest 2022. The band would win the third duel of the contest, beating out Neli Jerot's song "" to move on to the final round. LPS also won in the final, and as a result, represented Slovenia in the Eurovision Song Contest 2022 with "". At Eurovision, LPS were eliminated in the first semi-final after finishing in last place.

Members 
 Filip Vidušin – vocals
 Gašper Hlupič – drums
 Mark Semeja – electric guitar
 Zala Velenšek – bass guitar
 Žiga Žvižej – electronic keyboard

Discography

Live albums

Singles

References

External links 
 

Slovenian musical groups
Eurovision Song Contest entrants for Slovenia
Eurovision Song Contest entrants of 2022
2018 establishments in Slovenia